W. H. "Wild Bill" Turner (August 30, 1877 – May 11, 1917) was a Canadian-born American racecar driver.

Indianapolis 500 results

Worked in upper New York State

References

1877 births
1917 deaths
Indianapolis 500 drivers
Sportspeople from Buffalo, New York
Racing drivers from New York (state)
Canadian emigrants to the United States